Hymeniini is a tribe of the species-rich subfamily Spilomelinae in the pyraloid moth family Crambidae. The tribe was erected by Charles Swinhoe in 1900.

Hymeniini comprises five species in two genera:
Hymenia Hübner, 1825 (= Zinckenia Zeller, 1852)
Hymenia lophoceralis (Hampson, 1912)
Hymenia nigerrimalis (Hampson, 1900)
Hymenia perspectalis (Hübner, 1796)
Spoladea Guenée, 1854
Spoladea mimetica Munroe, 1974
Spoladea recurvalis (Fabricius, 1775)

References

Spilomelinae
Moth tribes